The name Andrew has been used for two tropical cyclones worldwide, two in the Atlantic.

In the Atlantic:
Tropical Storm Andrew (1986) – which paralleled the southeastern United States.
 Hurricane Andrew (1992) – one of only three Category 5 hurricanes to strike the United States, it hit Homestead, Florida and left $27.3 billion in damage.
The name was retired in the Atlantic after the 1992 hurricane season and was replaced with Alex.

Atlantic hurricane set index articles